Deh-e Sheykh Soltan Abdollah (also Romanized as Deh-e Sheykh Solṭān ʿAbdollah; also known as Deh-e Sheykh, Deh-i-Shaīkh, and Deh Sheykh) is a village in Dowlatabad Rural District, in the Central District of Jiroft County, Kerman Province, Iran. At the 2006 census, its population was 76, in 19 families.

References 

Populated places in Jiroft County